Meroleucoides is a genus of moths in the family Saturniidae first described by Charles Duncan Michener in 1949.

Species
Meroleucoides albomaculata (Dognin, 1916)
Meroleucoides amarillae Lemaire & Wolfe, 1995
Meroleucoides bipectinata Lemaire, 2002
Meroleucoides bipunctata Lemaire, 1982
Meroleucoides bravera Lemaire, 2002
Meroleucoides dargei Lemaire, 1982
Meroleucoides diazmaurini Decaens, Bonilla & Ramirez, 2005
Meroleucoides erythropus (Maassen, 1890)
Meroleucoides famula (Maassen, 1890)
Meroleucoides fassli Lemaire, 1995
Meroleucoides flavodiscata (Dognin, 1916)
Meroleucoides laverna (Druce, 1890)
Meroleucoides microstyx Lemaire, 2002
Meroleucoides modesta Lemaire, 2002
Meroleucoides nadiana Lemaire, 2002
Meroleucoides naias (Bouvier, 1929)
Meroleucoides nata (Maassen, 1890)
Meroleucoides penai Lemaire, 1982
Meroleucoides ramicosa (Lemaire, 1975)
Meroleucoides rectilineata Lemaire & Venedictoff, 1989
Meroleucoides riveti Lemaire, 2002
Meroleucoides verae van Schayck, 2000

References

Hemileucinae